Friedrich Schiller (1759–1805) was a German poet. 

Schiller may also refer to:

People
 Schiller (surname), including a list of people with that name

Businesses and organizations
 Schiller Institute, a LaRouchian think tank
 Schiller Piano Company, a former piano maker whose factory is an NRHP-listed property in Illinois
 Friedrich Schiller University of Jena, Germany
 Schiller International University, Florida, U.S.

Other uses
 Schiller (crater), a lunar impact crater
 Schiller (band), a German electronic musician
 Schiller, the metallic iridescent lustre originating from below the surface of a stone
 SS Schiller, a German ocean liner, wrecked in 1875

See also 
 Schiller Park (disambiguation)
 Shiller (disambiguation)